Mystery Girls is an American sitcom starring Tori Spelling and Jennie Garth that aires on ABC Family on June 25 through August 27, 2014. The series follows Holly and Charlie, former stars of the fictional 1990s TV detective series Mystery Girls who reunite to solve actual mysteries.

On September 8, 2014, it is cancelled after one season of ten episodes.

Cast

Main cast 
 Tori Spelling as Holly Hamilton, a vivacious, ditzy and fame-hungry former TV star who opens a detective agency.
 Jennie Garth as Charlie Contour, Holly's practical, tough and witty former co-star; she is married with a teenage daughter, and joins Holly to put a little excitement back into her life.
 Miguel Pinzon as Nick Diaz, an enthusiastic and excitable Mystery Girls super fan who persuades Holly and Charlie to hire him as their assistant.

Recurring cast 
 Adam Mayfield as Michael, Charlie's husband
 Ryan McPartlin as Police Detective Dwayne Freeman

Production 
In October 2013, ABC Family announced Garth's addition to a comedy pilot co-created by and starring Spelling. Noting the project to be a reunion of the Beverly Hills, 90210 costars, the network stated that Spelling, Garth and Maggie Malina would be executive producers, and cited Shepard Boucher as Spelling's co-creator. The series pickup was announced in January 2014, and in March 2014 the premiere date was set for June 25, 2014. On September 8, 2014, Mystery Girls was cancelled after one season of ten episodes.

Broadcast 

In Turkey, the series aired on Dizimax Comedy. The show started on December 19, 2014.

Episodes

Critical response
Allison Keene of The Hollywood Reporter said, "Playing up the meta appeal and jokes related to Spelling and Garth working together again, this show is silly and harmless fun." Gail Pennington of St. Louis Post-Dispatch gave the show two out of four stars, saying "Before they know it, the two have opened a detective agency together... the first half-hour is devoted to that setup, so we have to assume further episodes will find the "Girls" haplessly solving various quirky crimes." On Rotten Tomatoes, the series has an aggregated score of 69% based on 9 positive and 4 negative critic reviews.  The website’s consensus reads: " Though the execution is typical, the corny jokes and broad acting make Mystery Girls a fun, sentimental throwback sitcom that benefits from the nostalgic reunion of Tori Spelling and Jennie Garth." On Metacritic, the series has a score of 51 out of 100 based on 11 critic reviews, indicating "Mixed to Average"

References

External links 
 

2014 American television series debuts
2010s American sitcoms
ABC Family original programming
2010s American mystery television series
English-language television shows
Television shows set in Los Angeles
Television series by Disney–ABC Domestic Television